The 1980–81 South Pacific cyclone season was an above-average season.

Seasonal summary
This season marked the first time that the United States Joint Typhoon Warning Center issued warnings and performed best track analysis on significant tropical cyclones in the Southern Hemisphere.

Systems

Tropical Cyclone Diola

Diola existed from November 27 to November 30.

Severe Tropical Cyclone Arthur

Arthur existed from January 11 to January 17.

Tropical Cyclone Betsy

Betsy existed from January 30 to February 4.

Severe Tropical Cyclone Cliff

Cliff developed on February 9, near Vanua Lava, Vanuatu. The cyclone reached peak intensity on February 12, with an estimated central pressure of 975 hPa. It passed over New Caledonia at near peak intensity, with sustained winds . After crossing into the Australian region, Cliff struck Queensland on February 14, making landfall near Bundaberg. The cyclone caused some crop and structural damages in South East Queensland, and beach erosion occurred on the Gold and Sunshine coasts. One man was drowned off the Gold Coast.

Tropical Cyclone SP198006

This cyclone existed from February 16 to February 21.

Tropical Cyclone Daman

Daman existed from February 20 to February 24.

Tropical Cyclone SP198008

This cyclone existed from February 22 to March 7.

Severe Tropical Cyclone Freda

Freda existed from February 24 to March 9.

Tropical Cyclone Esau

Esau existed from March 1 to March 5.

Severe Tropical Cyclone Tahmar

Tahmar existed from March 8 to March 13.

Tropical Cyclone Fran

Fran existed from March 17 to March 24.

Other systems
The JTWC initiated warnings on Tropical Cyclone 12P during January 26, which had moved into the basin from the Australian region during the previous day. The system subsequently passed in between Vanuatu and New Caledonia before it was last noted during January 27.

Season effects

|-
| Diola
|-
| Arthur ||  || bgcolor=#| ||  ||  || || || ||
|-
| Cliff ||  || bgcolor=#| ||  ||  || || || ||
|-
| Unnamed || ||  ||  || || || ||
|-
| Daman || ||  ||  || || || ||
|-
| Unnamed || ||  ||  || || || ||
|-
| Freda ||  || bgcolor=#| ||  ||  || || || ||
|-
| Esau || || bgcolor=#| ||  ||  ||  || || ||
|-
| Tahmar ||  || bgcolor=#| ||  ||  || French Polynesia || ||  ||
|-
| Fran || || bgcolor=#| ||  ||  || || || ||
|-

See also

Atlantic hurricane seasons: 1980, 1981
Eastern Pacific hurricane seasons: 1980, 1981
Western Pacific typhoon seasons: 1980, 1981
North Indian Ocean cyclone seasons: 1980, 1981

References

External links 

 
South Pacific cyclone seasons
1980 SPAC
1981 SPAC